The United States Alpine Ski Championships is an alpine skiing competition organized by U.S. Ski & Snowboard.

Organization 
These championships have started with downhill in 1933 for men, followed in 1935 by slalom and combined. Women races have started in 1938.

Every year, one or several American ski resorts organize the events, generally beginning from end of March, after the last world cup race. Each title is given after a unique race. Some races may be cancelled (principally speed races) for weather or snow quality reasons.

The five disciplines are :
Downhill
Super-G from 1987
Giant slalom from 1952
Slalom
Combined

Results

Men

Women

References and notes

 1933 to 1967 : 
 1933 to 1976 : 
 1938 to 1996 - women : 
 1938 to 2020 - combined : 
 1987 : 
 1989 : 
 1991 : 
 1995 to now:

Alpine skiing competitions in the United States
National alpine skiing championships